Rongerik Atoll or Rongdrik Atoll (Marshallese:) is a coral atoll of 17 islands in the Pacific Ocean, and is located in the Ralik Chain of the Marshall Islands, approximately  east of Bikini Atoll.

History

Rongerik Atoll was claimed by the German Empire along with the rest of the Marshall Islands in 1884. After World War I, the island came under the South Seas Mandate of the Empire of Japan, although the island was uninhabited. The island became part of the vast US Naval Base Marshall Islands. Following the end of World War II, it came under the control of the United States as part of the Trust Territory of the Pacific Islands until the independence of the Marshall Islands in 1986.

It is most famous as the temporary location from March 7, 1946, through March 14, 1948, of the Bikini Atoll's indigenous population while the United States government conducted the Operation Crossroads nuclear tests.  After months of food shortages and malnutrition, they were moved first to Kwajalein and finally to Kili Island. On March 1, 1954, Rongerik was exposed to radioactive fallout as a result of the detonation of Operation Castle's Bravo.

According to Spanish researcher Emilio Pastor in a paper submitted to his government in 1948, a number of small islands in Micronesia (Kapingamarangi or Pescadores, Mapia or Güedes, Kiritimati or Matador, Rongerik or Coroa and others) continue legally under Spanish sovereignty. This is because the text of the German–Spanish Treaty of 1899 which transferred sovereignty of certain Spanish possessions in the Pacific to Germany, namely the Northern Mariana Islands (except Guam) and the Caroline Islands (including Palau), failed to include these smaller islands. Although the Spanish government studied the case in 1949 and accepted this interpretation, it has not asserted its claim to the islands.

See also

 Also contaminated by Castle Bravo test: Rongelap Atoll, Utirik Atoll, Ailinginae Atoll
 Desert island
 List of islands

References

External links

 Marshall Islands site
 
 A Short History of the People of Bikini Atoll

Atolls of the Marshall Islands
Ralik Chain
Former populated places in Oceania
Uninhabited islands of the Marshall Islands